The great scapular notch (or spinoglenoid notch) is a notch which serves to connect the supraspinous fossa and infraspinous fossa. It lies immediately medial to the attachment of the acromion to the lateral angle of the scapular spine.

The Suprascapular artery and  suprascapular nerve  pass around the great scapular notch anteroposteriorly.

Supraspinatus and infraspinatus are both supplied by the suprascapular nerve, which originates from the superior trunk of the brachial plexus (roots C5-C6).

Additional images

See also
 Suprascapular notch
 Suprascapular canal

References

External links

  - "Axillary Region: Scapula (Left)"

Scapula